The National Indian Music Competition (NIMC) is one of the three national music competitions organised by the National Arts Council in Singapore. First organised in 1998, the Competition has the following main aims:
 Develop the performing skills of musicians in Singapore
 Improve musical standards
 Identify potential music talents

In addition, the Competition aims to be a platform for musical excellence, providing young musicians with opportunities to perform in a competitive situation in front of an international jury. The competition is open to all Singapore citizens and permanent residents.

National Indian Music Competition 2014
The 2014 NIMC will be held from 16 to 22 June 2014 at the SOTA Drama Theatre. The competition comprises 8 solo categories. Participants may take part in  these various solo instrumental categories – Carnatic Vocal, Hindustani Vocal, Veena, Violin, Flute, Mridangam, Sitar and Tabla.

Each solo instrument category is divided into three age categories:
Open 		(30 years and below)
Intermediate 	(18 years and below)
Junior		(12 years and below)

Past Competition Winners
2011

 HM - Honourable Mention. Awarded to deserving finalists.

2008

 HM - Honourable Mention. Awarded to deserving finalists.

2006

 HM - Honourable Mention. Awarded to deserving finalists.

2004

2002

Other music competitions organised by the National Arts Council (Singapore) are the National Piano and Violin Competition and the 
National Chinese Music Competition.

External links
 Link to National Indian Music Competition Website

Indian music
Indian music awards